Revenue Retrievin': Overtime Shift is the thirteenth studio album by American rapper E-40, it was released on March 29, 2011 simultaneously with his 14th album, Revenue Retrievin': Graveyard Shift, the same way that he released his 11th and 12th albums.

The album has 20 tracks, and featured guest include B-Legit, Devin the Dude, Droop-E and Laroo T.H.H., among others.

Singles
"She Smashed the Homie" was released as promotional single for the album. The song features Snoop Dogg and Ray J with production by Chris "C.P DUBB" Washington, and was written by E-40 and Snoop Dogg.

A music video for "I Love my Momma" featuring R.O.D. and Mic Conn was released on April 15, 2011. Another one for "My Money Straight" featuring Guce, Black C, and Young Jun3 was released on March 16, along with one for "Rear View Mirror" featuring B-Legit and Stressmatic on August 13.

Reception

Commercial performance
Revenue Retrievin': Overtime Shift debuted at number 42 on the Billboard 200, with approximately 43,000 units sold in the first week.

Track listing

Charts

References

2011 albums
E-40 albums
EMI Records albums
Albums produced by Laylaw
Albums produced by Droop-E
Albums produced by Jake One
Albums produced by Chad Hugo